The 1994–95 Austrian Hockey League season was the 65th season of the Austrian Hockey League, the top level of ice hockey in Austria. 10 teams participated in the league, and VEU Feldkirch won the championship.

First round

Second round

Playoff round

Qualification round

Playoffs

Quarterfinals

Semifinals

Final

Relegation

External links
Austrian Ice Hockey Association

Aus
1994–95 in Austrian ice hockey leagues
Austrian Hockey League seasons